Chase Minter (born August 19, 1992) is an American soccer player.

Career

College
Minter played four years of college soccer at Cal Poly University between 2012 and 2015, including a red-shirted year in 2011.

Minter appeared for Premier Development League side Des Moines Menace in 2011, and Ventura County Fusion in 2013 and 2014.

Professional
On January 14, 2016, Minter was selected in the second round (21st overall) of the 2016 MLS SuperDraft by Columbus Crew. However, he wasn't signed by Columbus, instead joining United Soccer League side Sacramento Republic on March 16, 2016.

On August 4, 2016, Minter was sent on loan to USL side Tulsa Roughnecks.

Minter signed with United Soccer League side Real Monarchs on November 17, 2016. Minter was released by Real at the end of the 2017 season.

On February 21, 2018, Minter joined USL side Swope Park Rangers. Minter was released by Swope Park on December 3, 2018.

References

External links
Cal Poly bio

1992 births
Living people
American soccer players
Association football midfielders
Cal Poly Mustangs men's soccer players
Columbus Crew draft picks
Des Moines Menace players
People from Heath, Texas
Real Monarchs players
Sacramento Republic FC players
Soccer players from Texas
Sporting Kansas City II players
FC Tulsa players
USL Championship players
USL League Two players
Ventura County Fusion players